Ana Filipa Neto Sintra Baptista (born 24 January 1990) is a Portuguese chess player who holds the title of Woman FIDE Master (WFM, 2007). She is a three-time winner the Portuguese Women Chess Championship (2008, 2009, 2015).

Chess career
In 2003, in Graz, she won the European Communities Girls' Chess Championship in the U14 age group.

In Portuguese women's chess championships Baptista won three gold (2007/08, 2008/09, 2015/16), and three bronze (2000/01, 2001/02, 2006/07) medals.

Baptista played for Portugal in the Women's Chess Olympiads:
 In 2004, at first reserve board in the 36th Chess Olympiad (women) in Calvià (+4, =2, -3),
 In 2006, at first reserve board in the 37th Chess Olympiad (women) in Turin (+3, =4, -2),
 In 2008, at third board in the 38th Chess Olympiad (women) in Dresden (+7, =2, -2),
 In 2012, at third board in the 40th Chess Olympiad (women) in Istanbul (+4, =0, -4),
 In 2016, at first board in the 42nd Chess Olympiad (women) in Baku (+3, =1, -4).

References

External links
 (archive)

1990 births
Living people
Portuguese chess players
Chess Woman FIDE Masters
Chess Olympiad competitors